The Burmese yuhina (Yuhina humilis) is a species of bird in the family Zosteropidae. It is found in Myanmar and Thailand. Its natural habitat is subtropical or tropical moist montane forests.

References

Collar, N. J. & Robson, C. 2007. Family Timaliidae (Babblers)  pp. 70 – 291 in; del Hoyo, J., Elliott, A. & Christie, D.A. eds. Handbook of the Birds of the World, Vol. 12. Picathartes to Tits and Chickadees. Lynx Edicions, Barcelona.

Burmese yuhina
Birds of Myanmar
Birds of Thailand
Burmese yuhina
Taxonomy articles created by Polbot